This article shows statistics of individual players for the Slaven Belupo football club. It also lists all matches that Slaven Belupo played in the 2012–13 season.

First-team squad

Competitions

Overall

Prva HNL

Classification

Results summary

Results by round

Matches

Prva HNL

Europa League

Croatian Cup

Player seasonal records
Competitive matches only. Updated to games played 26 May 2013.

Top scorers

Source: Competitive matches

Appearances and goals

References

Croatian football clubs 2012–13 season